Zhou Jieqiong (born December 16, 1998), known professionally as Jieqiong or Kyulkyung (in Korean), is a Chinese singer and actress based in China and South Korea and signed under Pledis Entertainment. After finishing sixth in survival show Produce 101, she became a member of the girl group I.O.I. She was also a member of Pristin and its subgroup Pristin V. She made her solo debut with the single "Why" on September 6, 2018.

As an actress, she is best known for her roles in Miss Truth (2020), Legend of Fei (2020), To Be With You (2021) and Be My Princess (2022).

Early life and education
Zhou was born on December 16, 1998, in Taizhou, Zhejiang, China. She attended the Affiliated Secondary School of the Shanghai Conservatory of Music, where she specialized in the pipa. In 2009, she was discovered by Pledis Entertainment scouts in Shanghai, and moved to South Korea. In 2017, she graduated with a performing arts degree from the School of Performing Arts Seoul.

Career

2016: Produce 101 and I.O.I

Zhou participated in Mnet's survival television show, Produce 101, which aired from January 22 to April 1, 2016. Five of the participants from Pledis Entertainment were eliminated and only Zhou and Lim Na-young became part of the final line-up for the girl group I.O.I. Zhou ranked sixth with an overall of 218,338 votes. I.O.I made their debut on May 4 with the single, "Dream Girls".

2017: Debut with Pristin

After the disbandment of I.O.I, Zhou and Lim debuted with Pledis Entertainment's Pristin on March 21, 2017. Pristin officially debuted and released their first mini album, Hi! Pristin, accompanied by the title track, "Wee Woo".

2018–present: Pristin V and solo career 

In January 2018, Zhou joined as a dance mentor in the reality survival show, Idol Producer. In May, a Pristin subgroup named Pristin V was formed with Zhou and members Nayoung, Roa, Eunwoo, and Rena. They debuted on May 28, 2018, with the single album, Like a V. Zhou released a soundtrack for the television show I Got You, titled "Leave It to Brother". On August 31, Pledis Entertainment confirmed that Zhou would be making her solo debut in China with digital single, "Why", on September 6. She then had her solo debut stage the day after the song's release on iQiyi's Idol Hits. Zhou also made several television soundtrack appearances in Hi! Housemate and Love Timing with the singles "Hi! Housemate" and "有你有我" respectively. In October, it was confirmed that Zhou would make her acting debut in the historical mystery drama Miss Truth.
On May 24, 2019, Pristin was officially disbanded. Pledis Entertainment announced that Zhou would be staying with the label.

On February 14, 2020, after the premier of Miss Truth, Zhou released the OST for the show, "小窃喜" and "天籁". Zhou starred in the Chinese wuxia television series Legend of Fei in 2020. Zhou also played the main role in To Be With You released on February 15, 2021.

On May 4, 2021, Zhou and the members of I.O.I celebrated their 5th debut anniversary with a reunion live stream show called "Yes, I Love It!". Although Zhou was not in Korea, she made an appearance by video calling the members of I.O.I from China.

Zhou starred in iQiyi and Mango TV's romance drama Be My Princess aired on March 16, 2022.

Discography

Singles

Soundtrack appearances

Filmography

Film

Television series

Television shows

Songwriting credits
All song credits are adapted from the Korea Music Copyright Association's database, unless otherwise noted.

Notes

References

External links

 Zhou Jieqiong at Pledis 

1998 births
Living people
Chinese K-pop singers
Swing Entertainment artists
Korean-language singers of China
People from Taizhou, Zhejiang
Singers from Zhejiang
Chinese expatriates in South Korea
I.O.I members
Pristin members
Produce 101 contestants
Pledis Entertainment artists
21st-century Chinese women singers
Chinese television actresses
21st-century Chinese actresses
Actresses from Zhejiang
School of Performing Arts Seoul alumni
Reality show winners